The Latgale Party (LP) is a regionalist political party in Latvia representing the Latgalian minority of Latvia. It is a part of the New Unity coalition and since 2014, it has been led by Jānis Lāčplēsis and Aldis Adamovičs.

History 
The party was founded on 1 June 2012 in Preiļi and registered on 28 August the same year. The stated intention of the party was to represent the interest of Latgalian citizens on a state level.

At the 2013 municipal elections, the party received the most seats in the municipalities of Ludza, Preiļi, and Viļaka as well as being tied for most seats with Harmony Centre in Daugavpils and with the Union of Greens and Farmers in Riebiņi Municipality.

Ahead of the 2018 parliamentary elections, the party joined the newly founded New Unity party alliance. Despite this, some party candidates chose to run on the lists of KPV LV and the Progressives due to agreements within the individual local party chapters.

Election results

Legislative elections

Notes

References

External links 
 Official website

Political parties in Latvia
Latgale